The 1981 London Marathon was the first running of the annual marathon race in London, United Kingdom, which took place on Sunday, 29 March. The elite men's race was won in a time of 2:11:48 hours by two athletes, American Dick Beardsley and Inge Simonsen of Norway, who crossed the finish line holding hands. The women's race was won by Britain's Joyce Smith in 2:29:57.

Around 20,000 people applied to enter the race, of which 7747 had their applications accepted and around 7055 started the race. A total of 6255 runners finished the race.

Results

Men

Women

References

Results
Results. Association of Road Racing Statisticians. Retrieved 2020-04-24.

External links

Official website

1981
London Marathon
Marathon
London Marathon